Broderick Warner (1847–1881) was a Trinidadian cricketer. He played in one first-class match for Trinidad and Tobago in 1876/77.

See also
 List of Trinidadian representative cricketers

References

External links
 

1847 births
1881 deaths
Trinidad and Tobago cricketers